Stigmata is a Russian metalcore band based in Saint Petersburg that formed in 2000.

History 
Stigmata was formed in 2002 by Taras Umansky (guitar) and Denis Kichenko (bass guitar) as a nameless band. The band got its name a few months later. Some journalists said that the name has a religious background. In 2004, Nikita Ignatyev (drums) and vocalist Artyom Lotskih joined the band. In the first time of being a band, the group organized concerts and a music video on their own. The same year, the band signed a recording contract with Russian music label Kap-Kan Records and recorded the first full-length album entitled Конвейер снов (English: Conveyor of Dreams).

The album was re-released in May 2005. The third album Больше чем любовь (More than Love) was released in September 2005. In early 2006, Stigmata released a DVD called Pieces of Live consisting of 17 tracks. The same year, Nikita Ignatyev left the band and was replaced by Philipp Terpetsky. Andrey Anissimov became the new guitarist of the band. In December 2006, Stigmata released the first single called Лёд (Ice). The song was successful and ranked in the Russian Alternative Charts. The band won at the St. Petersburg Music Awards 2007 in the Category Song of the Year for their song "Ice". The group toured through Belarus, Estonia, Lithuania, and Ukraine on their first tour and shared a stage with Pleymo and Natalie Imbruglia on Russia's biggest Rock music festival The Wings.

2007 started with a concert tour through Russia with Killswitch Engage and Caliban. Their second single Сентябрь (September) was released in the same year. Stigmata signed to Navigator Records and produced the fourth studio album Stigmata. At the end of 2007, Philipp Terpetsky left the band and Fyodor Lokshin became the new drummer of Stigmata.

In 2008, the band released their second DVD titled Acoustic & Drive.

In 2009, the band released their third single Взлёт и Падение (Rise and Fall). In the same year, the fifth studio album Мой путь (My Way) was released. The album was released in two versions: A normal version with 10 tracks and a Digital version with an Intro, Outro and three music videos.

In summer 2010, the band played with Bullet for My Valentine in some concerts. A year later the band shared stage with Jane Air and The Korea.

Russian TV Channel A-One is one of the band promoters next to the Russian version of BRAVO and Vic Firth. Russian online retail store CD-Russia.com sell the albums worldwide.

Members 

 Denis Kichenko – bass (2003–present)
 Taras Umansky – rhythm guitar, backing vocals, programming (2003–present), lead guitar (2004–2006)
 Artyom "Nel'son" Lotskikh – lead vocals (2003–present)
 Artyom "Yosh" Teplinsky – lead guitar, programming (2009–2017, 2020–present)
 Vladimir Zynoviev – drums, percussion (2011–present)

Former members
 Dmitriy "Mitjay" Kozhuro – lead guitar, programming (2017–2020)
 Fyodor Lokshin – drums (2007–2011)
 Philipp "Phil" Terpetsky – drums (2006–2007)
 Nikita "Nick" Ignatyev – drums (2003–2006)
 Andrey "Duke" Anisimov – lead guitar (2006–2009)
 Sergey "Vint" Aigorov – rhythm guitar (2005)
 Igor Karpanov – lead guitar (2003–2004)
 Artur Maltsev – lead vocals (2003)

Discography

Albums 
 2004: Конвейер Снов (Conveyor of Dreams; Kap-Kan Records; re-issued in 2005)
 2005: Больше, Чем Любовь (More than Love; Kap-Kan Records)
 2007: Stigmata (Navigator Records)
 2009: Мой Путь (My Way; Navigator Records)
 2012: Основано На Реальных Событиях (Based on Real Events; Nikitin)
 2017: Mainstream? (Sliptrick Records)

EP 
 2015: Legion

Singles 
 2006: Лёд (Ice)
 2007: Сентябрь (September)
 2009: Взлёт и Падение (Rise and Fall) *
 2011: До Девятой Ступени (Until Nine Steps) *
 2011: Камикадзе (Kamikaze) *
 2017: Цунами (M2BA) *

* Released online only

DVDs 
 2006: Pieces of Life (Kap-Kan Records)
 2008: Acoustic & Drive (Navigator Records)

External links 
  (Russian)

Notes 

Musical groups from Saint Petersburg
Russian metalcore musical groups